Dione moneta, the Mexican silverspot, is a species of butterfly of the subfamily Heliconiinae in the family Nymphalidae found from southern United States to South America.

Subspecies
Listed alphabetically:
D. m. butleri Stichel, [1908]
D. m. moneta Hübner, [1825]
D. m. poeyii Butler, 1873

References

Butterflies described in 1779
Heliconiini
Nymphalidae of South America